Isaak Iselin (7 March 1728 in Basel – 15 July 1782 in Basel) was a Swiss philosopher of history and politics.

Iselin studied law and philosophy at the University of Basel and the University of Göttingen. In 1756 he became secretary of the republic of Basel. He was a co-founder of the Helvetic Society, the first national Swiss reform society. 

Iselin's Geschichte der Menschheit ("History of Humanity") was the first fully-fledged history of humanity in German. The Geschichte der Menschheit was provoked by what Iselin conceived as Montesquieu's climatological determinism and Rousseau's critique of progress and at the same time inspired by exponents of the Scottish Enlightenment such as Lord Kames. Iselin's pen-friend Moses Mendelssohn in his review of the first edition of 1764, lauded Iselin as one of the best German prose writers.

Works
Philosophische und Politische Versuche, 1760
Ueber die Geschichte der Menschheit, 1764
Versuch über die gesellige Ordnung, 1772
Träume eines Menschenfreundes, 1776

Recent edition of Iselin's works
 Gesammelte Schriften. Kommentierte Ausgabe. Schwabe Verlag, Basel 2014–2018.
 volume 1: Schriften zur Politik, ed. by Florian Gelzer, 2014, .
 volume 2: Schriften zur Ökonomie, ed. by Lina Weber, 2016, .
 volume 3: Schriften zur Pädagogik, ed. by Marcel Naas, 2014, .
 volume 4: Geschichte der Menschheit, ed. by Sundar Henny, 2018,  (open access).

References

 Béla Kapossy, Iselin contra Rousseau: Sociable Patriotism and the History of Mankind (Basel, Switzerland: Schwabe, 2006) (Schwabe Philosophica, 9).
 Andreas Urs Sommer, Geschichte als Trost. Isaak Iselins Geschichtsphilosophie (Basel: Schwabe, 2002) (= Schwabe Horizonte).
 Lucas Marco Gisi / Wolfgang Rother (ed.), Isaak Iselin und die Geschichtsphilosophie der europäischen Aufklärung (Basel: Schwabe, 2011).

See also
 Gesellschaft für das Gute und Gemeinnützige

External links

1728 births
1782 deaths
Swiss philosophers
Political philosophers